Pisochyn is an urban-type settlement in Kharkiv Raion of Kharkiv Oblast in Ukraine. It is essentially a western suburb of the city of Kharkiv. Pisochyn hosts the administration of Pisochyn settlement hromada, one of the hromadas of Ukraine. Population:

Economy

Transportation
Pisochyn and Ryzhov railway stations are on the railway connecting Kharkiv and Poltava. There is local passenger traffic.

The settlement is included in the road network of Kharkiv urban agglomeration. In particular, the eastern boundary of Pisochyn is the Kharkiv Ring Road.

References

Urban-type settlements in Kharkiv Raion